The members of the seventeenth National Assembly of South Korea were elected on 15  April 2004. The Assembly sat from 30 May 2004 until 29 May 2008.

Members

References

017
National Assembly members 017